Ngāruahine is a Māori iwi of New Zealand located in South Taranaki, North Island.

A treaty settlement was signed with the Crown in 2014. Following ratification of the settlement with the Crown, Te Korowai o Ngaruahine Trust (TKONT) was established as the Post Treaty Settlement Entity responsible for receiving, and managing the settlement funds (putea).

Te Korimako O Taranaki is the radio station of Ngāruahine and other Taranaki region iwi, including Ngati Tama, Te Atiawa, Ngāti Maru, Taranaki, Ngati Mutunga, Ngati Ruanui, Ngaa Rauru Kiitahi. It started at the Bell Block campus of Taranaki Polytechnic in 1992, and moved to the Spotswood campus in 1993.

Notable people

 

Tamati Hone Oraukawa

See also
List of iwi

References

External links
 Te Korowai o Ngāruahine Trust